William Rhode Merz (born March 10, 1963) is a retired United States Navy vice admiral who last served as deputy chief of naval operations for operations, plans and strategy from August 6, 2021 to October 7, 2022.	He previously served as commander of U. S. Seventh Fleet from 2019 to 2021. 

Merz's aboard assignments include , "Submarine Group Seven" and Task Force 74. As a flag officer, he was assigned to commands at naval mine destroyer ships and anti-submarine warfare command. Later, he was appointed to Task Force 77 stationed at San Diego and TF-54 in Bahrain.

Education
Bill Merz was born in San Diego, California. In 1986, he graduated with merit from the United States Naval Academy, earning a Bachelor of Science Degree in Ocean Engineering. He later earned Master's Degrees from The Catholic University of America and the Naval War College. VADM Merz also completed the MIT seminar XXI program and the University of Virginia "Strategic Thinking" program.

Career

VADM Merz served as a director during his ashore flag officer assignments, including Naval Undersea Warfare Center for a ballistic missile submarine program (OPNAV N97). Later, he was appointed as the Deputy Chief of Naval Operations for warfare systems (DCNO OPNAV N9). His  submarine design research assignments includes commanding officer of the U.S. naval reactors, chief of staff for the Submarine Force Commander. After serving aboard, he was assigned to command the deep-submergence vehicle NR-1, Los Angeles-class submarine  and a submarine squadron.

Awards and decorations

References

1963 births
Living people
People from San Diego
United States Naval Academy alumni
Military personnel from California
Catholic University of America alumni
Naval War College alumni
United States submarine commanders
Recipients of the Meritorious Service Medal (United States)
Recipients of the Legion of Merit
United States Navy vice admirals
Recipients of the Defense Superior Service Medal
Recipients of the Navy Distinguished Service Medal
Recipients of the Order of the Rising Sun, 2nd class